Don't Go Against the Grain is the only studio album by American hip hop group GP Wu. It was released on January 27, 1998 through MCA Records.

Background
One of many affiliates of the Wu-Tang Clan, GP Wu consisted of Pop da Brown Hornet (cousin of Wu-Tang Clan member Ghostface Killah), June Luva, Down Low Recka and Rubbabandz. The group had officially come together on Shyheim's 1996 album The Lost Generation. The group then signed with MCA Records and began work on Don't Go Against the Grain. "Black on Black Crime" and "1st Things First" were both released as singles and had music videos released, however neither made it to the Billboard charts. Production for album was mostly handled by group member Down Low Recka, with additional production done by group member June Luva, RNS and Visible. Hank Shocklee of The Bomb Squad served as the executive producer for the album.

Reception

Don't Go Against the Grain was not a commercial success and remains one of the least successful Wu-Tang affiliated albums. It only reached No. 44 on the Top R&B/Hip-Hop Albums and No. 15 on the Top Heatseekers, not selling enough copies to chart on the Billboard 200.

Critically, reviews for the album were mixed. AllMusic gave the album 2.5 stars out of 5, stating "the four members of GP Wu do a good job of replicating the Wu-Tang sound, but fail to live up to the somewhat lofty standards the rap conglomerate has established. Don't Go Against the Grain is a very consistent effort, overflowing with the style that is so distinct to hardcore East Coast rap. Consistency, however, is not necessarily genius. While the album is not completely forgettable, it fails to be particularly memorable either". Entertainment Weekly gave the album a B stating "GP Wu maintain Wu-Tang's quality and gritty authenticity without jacking their sound".

Track listing 
"Smoking" - 4:13
"1st Thing First" - 3:30
"Two Gats Up" - 4:00
"Blow Up" - 4:32
"Party People" - 3:53
"If You Only Knew" - 5:05
"Hit Me With That Shit" - 3:53
"Hip Hop" - 4:27
"Chamber Danger" - 3:27
"Underground Emperor" - 3:07
"Life Bid" - 5:39
"Don't Go Against the Grain" - 4:05
"Things Ain't What They Used to Be" - 4:32
"Black on Black Crime" - 3:29

Charts

Personnel
Isaac Booker – main artist, producer, recording, executive producer, production coordinator
James Wilson – main artist, producer, executive producer, production coordinator
Javahn Barry – main artist, producer, executive producer, production coordinator
Robert Briggs – main artist, executive producer, production coordinator
Arby Tyrone "RNS" Quinn – producer, mixing, recording
Visible – producer
Gary "Silky" Davis – executive producer, production coordination
Glenn Bolton – executive producer, A&R direction
Hank Shocklee – executive producer
Chris Barnett – recording, mixing
Carlton Batts – mastering
Ashley Fox – management

References

External links

1998 debut albums
MCA Records albums